The 2020–21 North Caledonian Football League (known for sponsorship reasons as the Macleod & MacCallum North Caledonian League) was the 112th season of the North Caledonian Football League. The season began on 17 October 2020, following a delay caused by the suspension of football activity due to the COVID-19 pandemic. Due to no league title being awarded for 2019–20, Golspie Sutherland began the season as the defending champions.

In January, the league management committee took the decision to pause the league schedule due to new COVID-19 protection levels that had been introduced in the Highland region. A week later, the Scottish FA confirmed that football at all levels below the SPFL Championship had been suspended while restrictions were in place.

Only one cup competition, the North Caledonian Cup, was drawn and competed for during the season, however due to the suspension of football activities at the turn of the year, the competition was abandoned for 2020–21. On 6 April 2021, it was announced the league's remaining games would be played between 22 May and 26 June. On 24 June, the season's two remaining fixtures were cancelled due to an uptick of COVID-19 cases in the Highlands. Golspie Sutherland defended their league title, winning the league ahead of the final round of fixtures.

Teams

Alness United returned to competition following a one-year period of abeyance, while Bunillidh Thistle chose not play in the league for 2020–21 due to concerns related to playing and traveling during the virus outbreak. The league also welcomed Highland Football League club Nairn County's reserve team as a league member for the first time since the 1950s. Taking the competing numbers up to 12 for the 2020–21 season were new clubs Loch Ness and Scourie.

Stadia and locations

Withdrew

Format
Following a meeting of clubs in August, it was agreed that for the 2020–21 season, the league would be temporarily split into two divisions of six teams – one for the North Caledonian League championship (League 1) and the other for the resurrected Ness Cup trophy (League 2). It was agreed that this change would be for the 2020–21 season only and that it would revert to a one division format for 2021–22. Teams who placed highest upon the suspension of football in the 2019–20 season were entered into League 1, while the remaining teams were joined by the league's new and returning entrants in League 2.

League tables

League 1

League 2

References

External links
 

2020-21
North
North Caledonian 2020